Pax aeterna is a 1917 Danish silent drama film directed by Holger-Madsen.

Main cast
 Frederik Jacobsen - King Elin XII
 Carlo Wieth - Crown Prince Alexis
 Zanny Petersen - Bianca
 Philip Bech - Professor Baron Claudius
 Carl Lauritzen Wilmer - War Minister
 Marius Egeskov - Gregor
 Anton de Verdier - Malcus

References

External links
 

1917 films
1917 drama films
Danish silent films
Danish black-and-white films
Danish drama films
Films directed by Holger-Madsen
Silent drama films